The Konkan, also Concan or Kokan, is a stretch of land by the western coast of India, running from Damaon in the north to Anjediva in the south; with the Arabian Sea to the west and the Deccan plateau in the east. The hinterland east of the coast has numerous river valleys and riverine islands among the hilly slopes leading up into the tablelands of the Deccan. The region has been recognised by name, since at least the time of Strabo in the third century C.E., and was a thriving mercantile port with Arab tradesmen from the 10th century. The best-known islands of Konkan are Ilhas de Goa, the site of the Goa state's capital at Panjim, and the seven islands of Bombay, on which lies the capital of the state of Maharashtra.main kokan starts from Alibag and ends with goa. There is most sacred place in kokan of goddess padmakshi renuka temple in Alibag, this goddess is shaktipeeth among 108 peethas where sati goddess brain part is fallen. some people also recommend that devi sati's nails fallen but this goddess is also called goddess of kokan.

Definition 
Historically, the limits of Konkan have been flexible, and it has been known by additional names like "Aparanta" and "Gomanchal", the latter being defined as the coastal area between the Daman Ganga River in the north and the Gangavalli River in the south.

The ancient Sapta Konkan was a larger geographical area that extended from Gujarat to Kerala and included the whole region of coastal Maharashtra and coastal Karnataka. However, this segment overlaps the Konkan and Malabar coast continuum; and usually corresponds to the southernmost and northernmost stretches of these locales respectively.

Etymology 
According to the Sahyadrikhanda of the Skanda Purana, Parashurama threw his axe into the sea and commanded the Sea God to recede up to the point where his axe landed. The new piece of land thus recovered came to be known as Saptah-Konkana, meaning "piece of earth", "corner of earth", or "piece of corner", derived from Sanskrit words: koṇa (कोण, corner) + kaṇa (कण, piece). Xuanzang, the noted Chinese Buddhist monk, mentioned this region in his book as Konkana Desha; Varahamihira's Brihat-Samhita described Konkan as a region of India; and 15th century author Ratnakosh mentioned the word Konkandesha.

Geography 

The Konkan extends throughout the western coasts of Maharashtra, Goa and Karnataka. It is bounded by the Western Ghats mountain range (also known as Sahyadri) in the east, the Arabian Sea in the west, the Daman Ganga River in the north and the River Aghanashini in the south. The Gangavalli flows in the district of Uttara Kannada in present-day Karnataka. Its northern bank constitutes the southernmost portion of Konkan. The towns of Karwar, Ankola, Kumta, Honavar and Bhatkal fall within the Konkan coast. The largest city on the Konkan coast is Mumbai, the state capital of Maharashtra. Districts on the Konkan coast are, from north to south:
 Palghar district
 Thane district
 Mumbai Suburban district
 Mumbai City district
 Raigad district
 Ratnagiri district
 Sindhudurg district
 Uttara Kannada (Karwar)

Ethnology 

The main ethnolinguistic group of the Konkan region is the Konkani people. Specific caste and communities found in the region are the Aagri, Koli, Bhandari, Kunbi, Maratha, Gabit, Mangela, Karadi, Phudagi, Vaiti, Kharvi, Teli, Kumbhar, Nhavi, Dhobi, Kasar, Sutar, Lohar, Chambhar, Mahar, Dhangar, Gaud Saraswat Brahmin (also includes Rajapur Saraswats and Chitrapur Saraswats), Daivajna Brahmin, Kudaldeshkar, Pathare Prabhu, Gomantak Maratha, Chitpawan, Karhade, Kayastha Prabhu, Panchkalshi, Vani, Komarpant, Vadval, Gavli, Ghorpi, Nath Jogi, Gurav, Pagi, Kalan, Ghadi, Padti, Vanjari, Namdev Shimpi and others. Billava, Bunt, Mogaveera and Linghayat communities found in the parts of Karnataka which are near to Konkan. 

Tribal communities include the Katkari, Thakar, Konkana, Warli and Mahadev Koli, mainly found in the northern and central parts of Konkan. The Dubla and Dhodia tribes in southern Gujarat, Dadra and Nagar Haveli, and Palghar district of Maharashtra are also part if Konkan. Palghar district has the largest percentage of tribal population in Konkan. A small nomadic tribe called the Vanarmare is found in southern parts of Konkan, which was originally associated with the hunting of monkeys. The Gauda and Velip tribes are found in Goa.

The Jewish community called Bene Israel is mainly found in Raigad district. The Christians included East Indians in North Konkan and Mumbai, Goan Catholics in Goa, Karwari Catholics in Uttara Kannada as well as Mangalorean Catholics in Udupi and Dakshina Kannada.

Major Muslim communities like Konkani Muslims and Nawayaths are scattered throughout the whole region. They are reportedly descendants of people who came from Hadhramaut (in Yemen or South Arabia), and other parts of Arabia and the Middle East. The Siddis have their roots in Africa.

See also 
People of the Konkan Division
Konkan Railway
Jaitapur Nuclear Power Project
Malabar Coast
Coromandel Coast

References

External links 

Konkan Tourism – a complete guide on tourism
Konkan Hotels
Tourist Place to visit Konkan Darshan

 
Regions of India
Landforms of Goa
Coasts of India
Konkani